Tugford is a hamlet in Shropshire, England. It lies in the civil parish of Abdon and Heath (formerly Abdon), between Bouldon and Holdgate, on the boundary of the relatively flat Corvedale and the upland Clee Hills.

The church of St Catherine dates from the 12th century and is a Grade II* listed building. It features two sheela na gig statues.

History 
In 1676 the parish had 103 adult inhabitants. In 1801 the population rose to 165 and then rose again to 197 ten years later. Since then the population has been in decline and by 1961 it was just 86.

See also
Listed buildings in Abdon, Shropshire

References

Hamlets in Shropshire
Former civil parishes in Shropshire